Polen Tantuni is a Turkish restaurant chain known for combining traditional Mediterranean flavours with a modern style.

The brand's first restaurant was launched in 2009 in Antalya, Turkey. Since then, the company has grown to more than 50 branches across Europe and Asia, including in Russia, Germany, France, Iran, and Uzbekistan.

External links
 Official website

Restaurant chains
Turkish restaurants
2009 establishments in Turkey